Meshoppen can refer to:
 Meshoppen Township, Wyoming County, Pennsylvania
 The borough of Meshoppen, Pennsylvania